Lily Mithen (born 2 March 1998) is an Australian rules footballer playing for the Melbourne Football Club in the AFL Women's competition. She was drafted by Melbourne with their tenth selection and seventy-third overall in the 2016 AFL Women's draft. After the nineteen point win against  at Ikon Park in round two—in which she recorded fourteen disposals, three marks  and two tackles—she was the round nominee for the AFLW Rising Star. She played every match in her debut season to finish with seven games. She also won Geelong's 2017 best and fairest award in the club's VFL Women's team.

Melbourne signed Mithen for the 2018 season during the trade period in May 2017.

Mithen's grandfather's cousin is Laurie Mithen – a Melbourne great, who played in five premierships and was named in the club's team of the century.

Honours
 Geelong Junior Football
 Best & Fairest (Youth Girls): 2014 (tied)
 Premiers (Youth Girls): Newtown & Chilwell 2014, 2015
 Geelong (VFL Women's)
 Best & Fairest : 2017
 Melbourne (AFL Women's)
 Premiers: S7 (2022)

References

External links 

1998 births
Living people
Melbourne Football Club (AFLW) players
Australian rules footballers from Victoria (Australia)
Darebin Falcons players